The following timeline of political parties in the United Kingdom shows the period during which various parties were active, from their date of establishment to their date of dissolution.  Defunct parties are shown in green, and currently active parties are shown in pink.  An asterisk or dagger indicates that the exact year of establishment or dissolution, respectively, is not certain.  Where a party has changed its name over the course of its existence, only the most recent name is given.

Established before 1900

Established between 1900 and 1924

Established between 1925 and 1949

Established between 1950 and 1974

Established between 1975 and 1999

Established since 2000

See also 
List of political parties in the United Kingdom

 
Political parties in the United Kingdom
Political parties in the United Kingdom